Broadway Nights  is a 1927 American lost film. It was the film debut of Barbara Stanwyck, Sylvia Sidney and Ann Sothern.

Cast
 Sam Hardy as Johnny Fay 
 Lois Wilson as Fanny Franchette 
 Philip Strange as Bronson 
 De Sacia Mooers as Texas Guinan 
 Barbara Stanwyck and Ann Sothern as fan dancers
 June Collyer and Sylvia Sidney as themselves

Reception 
In a contemporary review, critic May Tinee of the Chicago Tribune wrote: "This story of stage life and stage people, author and director presented with genuine insight and understanding. It was full of 'atmosphere' and as human as could be."

References

External links

Lantern slide and still at silenthollywood.com

1927 films
1927 lost films
1927 romantic drama films
American romantic drama films
American silent feature films
American black-and-white films
First National Pictures films
Lost American films
Lost romantic drama films
Films directed by Joseph Boyle
1920s American films
Silent romantic drama films
Silent American drama films